Vino Barclett (born 12 October 1999) is a professional footballer who plays as a goalkeeper internationally for Saint Lucia and domestically for Cavalier F.C. in the Jamaican National Premier League.

Career
Barclett was signed by Cavalier F.C. ahead of the 2022 season as a replacement goalkeeper for Jeadine White who left Cavalier in order to begin pre-season training with Phoenix Rising FC of the USL Championship. Barclett said he had to adapt his style of play to suit Cavalier, to come for more crosses, and improve his ball playing abilities. Such was Barclett’s early season form for Cavalier he received Man of the Match awards in consecutive games in February 2022 and he was nicknamed “The Wall” by sections of the local press. Barclett saved penalties from Donovan Segree and Daniel Green as Cavalier defeated Mount Pleasant 4-3 on spot-kicks in the quarter-final of the 2022 National Premier League play-offs. However, after a 4-4 draw on aggregate in the semi-final against Dunbeholden F.C. Barclett was unable to prevent a 4-2 penalty shoot-out defeat for his side in July 2022.

International career
Barclett was playing in goal for the Saint Lucia national football team in June 2022 as they secured promotion from League C of the 2022–23 CONCACAF Nations League. This came following back to back victories under the management of Stern John. First, a 1-0 away win over Dominica at Windsor Park, which included a fingertip save in the 59th minute from Barclett from a free kick from Anfernee Frederick. Second, a 2-0 home win against Anguilla at the Darren Sammy Cricket Ground.

References

External links

Living people
1999 births
Saint Lucian footballers
Saint Lucia international footballers
Saint Lucian expatriate footballers
Association football goalkeepers 
Saint Lucia youth international footballers
Cavalier F.C. players
National Premier League players